Polyortha paranae is a species of moth of the family Tortricidae. It is found in Brazil.

References

Moths described in 1981
Polyortha
Moths of South America
Taxa named by Józef Razowski